Calytrix patrickiae is a species of plant in the myrtle family Myrtaceae that is endemic to Western Australia.

Found on a small area in the Wheatbelt region of Western Australia between Kulin and Lake Grace where it grows on sandy soils.

References

Plants described in 2013
patrickiae
Flora of Western Australia
Taxa named by Barbara Lynette Rye